Michael Gerber (born June 14, 1969) is best known as the author of the Barry Trotter series, Sunday Times best-selling parodies of the Harry Potter books. Before becoming a novelist, Gerber contributed humor to The Yale Record, The New Yorker, The Atlantic, The New York Times, The Wall Street Journal, Slate, NPR and Saturday Night Live, among many other venues. He is an alumnus of Yale and Oak Park River Forest High School.

In October 2015, Gerber launched The American Bystander, an all-star print humor quarterly. The magazine was an immediate hit, garnering strongly positive reviews in The New York Times and Newsweek, which hailed Bystander as "the last great humor magazine." As of January 2020, Bystander's thirteen issues have raised over $290,000 via crowdfunding and subscriptions on Patreon. Gerber currently serves as Editor & Publisher, personally handling all aspects of the venture. This auteurist method is somewhat unique in publishing; Gerber refined and perfected it with Barry Trotter and his other large-scale parodies of the 90's and 00's. In addition to providing an old-style closeness between editor and audience (as with Hugh Hefner and Stan Lee), its efficiency allows Bystander to pay its contributors.

A March 2019 column in The New York Times by Jennifer Finney Boylan lauded Gerber's "hard work and genius" as it detailed Bystander'''s long, strange path to publication. In early 1982, a full pilot issue was prepared by then-Editor Brian McConnachie and Managing Editor Boylan, but funding fell through before it could be distributed; Gerber referred to this test-run as he prepared the 2015 edition, blending it with contemporary trends in comedy and design. Boylan wrote that the result is a "beautiful, hilarious magazine — very much what we always hoped the Bystander would become."

While an undergraduate, Gerber restarted The Yale Record, America's oldest humor magazine. Gerber served as President of The Record's alumni organization from 1994 to 2014, developing an editorial and publishing model for the magazine. As a result, he is frequently contacted by student editors from all around the world, and has most recently worked with students at DePaul University, Ohio State University, Cambridge University, and UCLA.

His humor novels have sold 1.2 million copies in 25 languages worldwide.

Before turning to comedy, Gerber considered a career as an historian specializing in the 1960s and 70s. In 2008 he, along with novelist/editor Ed Park and author Devin McKinney, launched the popular Beatles fan site Hey Dullblog. Gerber has run the site for over a decade, and it has become a well-loved source for intelligent-if-irreverent analysis of the group, its music, and the era.

 Bibliography Barry Trotter and the Shameless Parody (2002) Barry Trotter and the Unnecessary Sequel (2003) Barry Trotter and the Dead Horse (2004) The Chronicles of Blarnia: The Lying Bitch in the Wardrobe (2005) Freshman (2006) Sophomore (2006) Our Kampf: Collected Humor 1989-2004 (2006) A Christmas Peril (2008) Life After Death for Beginners (2010) Downturn Abbey'' (2012) 
The American Bystander #1 (2015) 
The American Bystander #2 (2016) 
The American Bystander #3 (2016) 
The American Bystander #4 (2017) 
The American Bystander #5 (2017) 
The American Bystander #6 (2017) 
The American Bystander #7 (2018) 
The American Bystander #8 (2018) 
The American Bystander #9 (2018) 
The American Bystander #10 (2019) 
The American Bystander #11 (2019) 
The American Bystander #12 (2019) 
The American Bystander #13 (2019) 
The American Bystander #14 (2020)

References

External links
 Michael Gerber's Website
 American Bystander Website
 Beatles Fan Website

1969 births
Living people
American humorists
The Yale Record alumni
American male novelists
American parodists
Fantasy parodies